Atractus peruvianus, the Peru ground snake, is a species of snake in the family Colubridae. The species can be found in Peru.

References 

Atractus
Reptiles of Peru
Endemic fauna of Peru
Reptiles described in 1862
Taxa named by Giorgio Jan